Robert Sheppard is British poet and critic. He is at the forefront of the movement sometimes called "linguistically innovative poetry".

Life

Robert Sheppard was born in 1955 and was educated at the University of East Anglia (BA; MA; PhD). In 1996 he moved from London to Liverpool to teach at Edge Hill University as Professor of Poetry and Poetics and Programme Leader of the MA in Creative Writing. In 1996, Sheppard became Emeritus Professor at Edge Hill.

Poetry and Criticism

Sheppard's magnum opus is his long-running work "Twentieth Century Blues". This was composed over many years, and published piece-meal before Salt Publishing brought out the complete work in 2008. "Hymns to the God in which My Typewriter Believes", published in 2006, illustrates Sheppard's view of poetry as one art among many, as it alludes to and builds on other artforms. Sheppard's sonnet sequence, "Warrant Error" was published by Shearsman Books in 2009. According to Sean Colletti, Sheppard is a major talent, whose use of form includes precise use of the couplet, while  Alan Baker calls his work "political poetry of the first order."

Sheppard has edited important studies of poets Roy Fisher and Lee Harwood, and is editor of the Journal of British and Irish Innovative Poetry" and the blogzine "Pages".

Published works

Poetry:
Returns:Textures,1985
Daylight Robbery: Stride, 1990
The Flashlight Sonata: Stride,1993
Empty Diaries: Stride, 1998
The Lores: Reality Street Editions, 2003
The Anti-Orpheus: A Notebook
Tin Pan Arcadia: Salt Publishing, 2004
Hymns to the God in which My Typewriter Believes: Stride, 2006
Complete Twentieth Century Blues: Salt Publishing, 2008
Warrant Error, Exeter: Shearsman Books, 2009
Berlin Bursts, Exeter: Shearsman Books, 2011
A Translated Man, Exeter: Shearsman Books, 2013
Words Out of Time, Newton-le-Willows: Knives, Forks and Spoons, 2015
Unfinish (forthcoming: London: Veer Publications)

Shorter Poetry Collections and Pamphlets:

Dedicated to you but you weren’t listening, London: Writers Forum, 1979
Returns, London:Textures,1985
Private Number, London: Northern Lights Publishers, 1986
Letter from the Blackstock Road, London: Oasis Books, 1988
Internal Exile, Southampton: Torque Press,1988
Codes and Diodes (with Bob Cobbing), London: Writers Forum, 1991
Fox Spotlights, Cheltenham: The Short Run Press, 1995
Free Fists (with Patricia Farrell), London: Writers Forum, 1996
Neutral Drums (with Patricia Farrell), London: Writers Forum, 1999
Blatent Blather/Virulent Whoops (with Bob Cobbing), London: Writers Forum, 2001
The Anti-Orpheus: a notebook, Exeter: Shearsman Books, 2004. (Also available as an e-book at www.shearsman. com)
Risk Assessment (with Rupert Loydell) Damaged Goods, 2006
The Given, Newton-le-Willows: Knives Forks and Spoons, 2010
The Only Life, Newton-le-Willows: Knives Forks and Spoons, 2012
HAP: Understudies of Thomas Wyatt's Petrarch, Newton-le-Willows: Knives Forks and Spoons, 2018

As Editor:

Floating Capital: New Poets from London
News for the Ear: Homage to Roy Fisher
The Salt Companion to Lee Harwood
The Door of Taldire: Selected Pomes of Paul Evans
Twitters for a Lark - Poetry of the European Union of Imaginary Authors

Criticism:
For Language: Poetics and Linguistically Innovative Poetry 1978-1997
The Poetry of Saying: British Poetry and its Discontents (Liverpool University Press, 2005)
Iain Sinclair (Northcote House, 2007)

References

External links
 Official blog

1955 births
Living people
Alumni of the University of East Anglia
Academics of Edge Hill University
British poets
British male poets